The Libre Software Meeting (LSM) is an annual free software event originally held in France. The French name of this event is Rencontres mondiales du logiciel libre (RMLL).

Summary 

The Libre Software Meeting takes place each year since 2000, in July. Launched by the French free software users group Association Bordelaise des utilisateurs de logiciels libres (ABUL). More than 1000 people, coming from more than 50 countries, participate each year.

The LSM is a mix of two complementary meetings:
 a developers meeting, free software coders coming to discuss about their projects during the event
 a free software promotion event dedicated to a large audience

Organisation 

The LSM is organized by a team of volunteers, combining local and national free software associations.

Villages 

The village of the associations welcome the visitors with a set of stands presenting local or national associations.

Hosting cities

Logo 

The LSM logo was drawn with Sketch by André Pascual, Linuxgraphic.org co-creator, for the LSM 2001. The choice of the mascot and her name come from the homophony with Armelle (a French feminine first name) and RMLL, as pronounced in English.

See also 
 List of free-software events
 LibrePlanet

External links

Homepage of Libre Software Meeting

Free-software conferences
Linux conferences
Recurring events established in 2000
Free software